FOTM may refer to:
 FOTM - Friends of Old Time Music, an album featuring Roscoe Holcomb
 FAQ of the month, a feature of the GameFAQs website